** may refer to:

 **, to express exponentiation in some programming languages
 **, a pointer to a pointer in C syntax
 **, interpolation of keyword arguments into function calls in Python; See Asterisk
 **, symbol in astronomical notation representing:
 binary star
 double star
 multiple star
 multiple star system
 2018 Winter Paralympics, whose logo is a pair of vertically side-by-side 1-pointed asterisks

See also
 * (disambiguation)